Sybra albomaculata is a species of beetle in the family Cerambycidae. It was described by Breuning in 1939. It contains two subspecies, Sybra albomaculata albomaculata and Sybra albomaculata formosana.

References

albomaculata
Beetles described in 1939